The U.S. Grant Hotel is a historic and one of the oldest hotels in downtown San Diego, California operating under a franchise of Marriott International as part of their Luxury Collection brand. It is listed on the National Register of Historic Places. It is 11 stories high and has 270 guest rooms in addition to meeting rooms and multiple ballrooms.

History
Fannie Chaffee Grant purchased the Horton House in 1895 and decided to tear it down in 1905. Her husband, Ulysses S. Grant Jr. (son of President Ulysses S. Grant), oversaw the building of the Grant Hotel, which opened in 1910 and was named after his father. Architect Harrison Albright designed the hotel. San Diego voters helped finance $700,000 for the $1.5 million needed to construct the hotel after Grant lacked the funds to do so. The hotel opened on October 15, 1910 and included two swimming pools as well as a ballroom on the top floor.

The Grant Hotel was, for nearly 35 years, until 1974, the site of the annual reunion dinner of the "Great White Fleet Association," a group of sailors who sailed on the cruise of 16 white battleships from 1907-09. These dinners attracted a wide range of military officials and guests from all over the world.

The hotel's signature restaurant is the Grant Grill, which opened in 1952. It became a power-lunch spot for downtown businessmen, lawyers and politicians, so much so that "ladies" were not permitted in the restaurant before 3 PM. In 1969 a group of prominent local women staged a sit-in which resulted in the restaurant abandoning its men-only policy. A plaque showing the first women reservation at Grant Grill is displayed to show the historic change that the restaurant underwent post 1969. 

The inaugural San Diego Comic-Con International, which was then called "San Diego’s Golden State Comic-Con", was held at the U.S. Grant Hotel in 1970. 

The hotel was refurbished in the 1980s, but fell upon hard times in the subsequent decade due to a financial slump. The hotel changed hands several times during the 1990s. In 2003, the hotel was purchased by the Sycuan Band of the Kumeyaay Nation as a tribute to the contributions of the former US President for the Native American community during his presidency. The new management closed the doors for 21 months to renovate the building and reopened in October 2006. The hotel is currently operated by Marriott Hotels & Resorts as a part of its Luxury Collection. The official name of the property is The U.S. Grant, a Luxury Collection Hotel, San Diego.

The U.S Grant was also home to the local radio station KFSD for a long time between early 1930’s and 1939 and carried radio towers on both the towers of the property. KFSD had a dedicated portion of 11th floor to perform its operations and entertain the residents of San Diego. A floor plan indicating the design of KFSD during that time is still available in the basement of the property.

Grant Grill restaurant 
The hotel has an American cuisine restaurant that has great history. Grant grill has an elaborate bar with seating that takes back guests to the days as early as 1960's.

Guests
Famous guests have included Albert Einstein, Charles Lindbergh, Woodrow Wilson, five former First ladies and 12 United States Presidents. Portraits of all the distinguished guests are available for public viewing on the second floor of the hotel. The hotel includes three presidential suites that have been tailored to Secret Service requirements for accommodating presidential visits.

References

External links

 

1910 establishments in California
Grant
Buildings and structures in San Diego
Hotel buildings completed in 1910
Hotel buildings on the National Register of Historic Places in California
Hotels established in 1910
Hotels in San Diego
The Luxury Collection
National Register of Historic Places in San Diego